Greg Hart is an English guitarist who is a co-founding member of the UK power pop rock band Cats in Space. The band was established in 2015 with rock drummer/percussionist Steevi Bacon.

History
Hart's career started off in southern England based heavy metal band Snowblind that he formed with school friends (1980). After working with several other local bands he co-founded London rock band Moritz who recorded one EP Shadows of a Dream (1987) before splitting. In 1988 he helped form If Only with management team Harry Cowell and Simon Napier-Bell and recorded one album featuring ex-Girlschool vocalist Jackie Bodimead. The band toured the UK with ex-Ian Gillan bass player John McCoy.

In 1991 he joined up with Geoff Downes, to co-write songs and sing on the Asia album Aqua (1992) and also guested on live TV with Mike Oldfield to help promote his last album for the Virgin label Heaven's Open.

After signing a publishing deal with Peter McCamley, he teamed up for several songs with Michael Moran who also guested as orchestra leader on the debut album Too Many Gods by Cats in Space (2015). Hart also wrote songs for Donna Summer which are yet to be released, with music writer Bob Mitchell, who wrote for Cheap Trick "The Flame"

In 1995, he teamed up with keyboardist Toby Sadler and Sam Blu to record two albums under the name GTS, a studio project AOR band.

Reforming Moritz in 2008, the band recorded two albums Undivided and SOS’ on Harmony Factory, before he quit to form Cats in Space.

Discography

Albums 
Cats in Space
 Too Many Gods (2015, Harmony Factory)
 Scarecrow (2017, Harmony Factory)
 Cats Alive! (2018, Harmony Factory)
 Daytrip to Narnia (2019, Harmony Factory)
 Atlantis (2020, Harmony Factory)

Moritz
 Shadows of a Dream EP (1987, RFB Records)
 City Streets (2008, Harmony Factory)
 Undivided (2009, Harmony Factory)
 SOS (2012, Harmony Factory)

If Only
 No Bed of Roses  (1992, Czar Record)
 Destiny (2002, Outlaw Records)
 The Ghost of You (2004, Outlaw Records)

GTS
 Tracks From the Dustshelf (1995, GT Records)
 Time Stood Still (1996, GT Records)

Hartless
 Full Circle (2007, Harmony Factory)

Guest appearances 
 Geoff Downes Vox Humana (1992, JIMCO/Blueprint Records)
 Asia Aqua (1992)
 Asia Archiva Vol. 1 (1996)
 Asia Archiva Vol. 2
 Noon (2013)
 Janey Bombshell Rocka-Roll-Around (2013)
 Decades (2017)

References

Living people
English songwriters
English rock guitarists
English male guitarists
English pop rock singers
Lead guitarists
Cats in Space members
Year of birth missing (living people)
British male songwriters